Aleksandr Matveyevich Elizarov (also Yelizarov) (born 7 March 1952) is a former Soviet biathlete. At the 1976 Winter Olympics in Innsbruck, he won a gold medal with the Soviet relay team, and an individual bronze medal.

Biathlon results
All results are sourced from the International Biathlon Union.

Olympic Games
2 medals (1 gold, 1 bronze)

World Championships
4 medals (1 gold, 3 silver)

*During Olympic seasons competitions are only held for those events not included in the Olympic program.

References

External links
 

1952 births
Living people
Soviet male biathletes
Biathletes at the 1976 Winter Olympics
Olympic biathletes of the Soviet Union
Medalists at the 1976 Winter Olympics
Olympic medalists in biathlon
Olympic bronze medalists for the Soviet Union
Olympic gold medalists for the Soviet Union
Biathlon World Championships medalists
Honoured Coaches of Russia